Aquacade, previously designated Rhyolite, was a class of SIGINT spy satellites operated by the National Reconnaissance Office for the United States Central Intelligence Agency. The National Security Agency (NSA) was also reportedly involved. The program, also known by SIGAD AFP-720 and SIGAD AFP-472, respectively, is still classified. During the same period, the Canyon SIGINT satellites were in use with an apparently somewhat different set of capabilities.

History 
The name of the program, originally "Rhyolite", was changed to "Aquacade" in 1975 following the disclosure of the codeword "Rhyolite" in the trial of Christopher Boyce and Andrew Lee.

The Rhyolite/Aquacade satellites, made by TRW, are rumored to have an umbrella-like reflecting dish 20 meters in diameter. They were succeeded by the Magnum/Orion and Mentor series of satellites.

Satellites
It is believed that at least four Rhyolite/Aquacade satellites were launched from Cape Canaveral between June 1970 and April 1978 on Atlas-Agena D launch vehicles, all of which sported distinctive elongated payload shrouds (presumably to house the satellite's large parabolic antenna). Secrecy around the program was tight and the initial Rhyolite mission in 1970 was the first space launch at Cape Canaveral in seven years that reporters were not invited to cover. These were among the final Atlas-Agena launches as well as the last use of LC-13 at CCAS. The satellites had a mass of approximately 700 kg and operated in near-geosynchronous orbits over the Middle East. Signals were relayed to a remote NSA Earth station in Australia, Pine Gap, out of range of Soviet detection. From there, they would be encrypted and sent via another satellite to the NSA's headquarters at Fort Meade for analysis.

The Canyon Satellite Program was a contemporaneous, near-geosynchronous program with closer ties to the United States Air Force.

References

 Richelson, Jeffrey T. ed. U.S. Military Uses of Space, 1945-1991 Vol 1, Guide. National Security Archive. 1991.
 SIGINT overview from Federation of American Scientists

1973 in spaceflight
National Reconnaissance Office satellites
Signals intelligence satellites
Cold War
Military equipment introduced in the 1970s